Gordon v Selico (1986) 18 H.L.R. 219 is an English contract law on the subject of misrepresentation by action. It was held that positive actions - in this case, the concealment of dry rot - could amount to operative misrepresentations.

Facts
Mr Gordon and Mrs Teixeira, contracted in November 1978 to purchase a 99-year lease of a flat owned by the defendant, Selico Ltd.  The flat was in poor condition, as was the block that contained it, with some evidence of dry rot. Prior to the first inspection by the plaintiffs in about November 1978, the second defendants had instructed some painters to conceal patches of dry rot from view, by painting them. The plaintiffs obtained a detailed survey of the flat in February 1979, which concluded that no dry rot had been found (although only one floorboard had been lifted, and it could not be guaranteed that it did not exist elsewhere in the flat). The plaintiffs moved into their flat on 1 January 1980 and subsequently discovered extensive dry rot in the front bedroom, bathroom and lavatory.

Judgment
Ordinarily, a misrepresentation is made by a statement of supposed fact, or otherwise a statement of intent. It was held by the Court of Appeal that the painting of dry rot to conceal it amounted to a misrepresentation. The court distinguished the set of facts from other cases, where it was held that reliance on an independent surveyor's findings defeated a claim of misrepresentation:

See also
 English contract law
 Misrepresentation in English law

References

English misrepresentation case law
Court of Appeal (England and Wales) cases
1986 in case law
1986 in British law